Tamar Huggins (born January 7, 1986) is a Canadian tech entrepreneur, author and educator, based in Toronto. She is a trailblazer for diversity, equity and inclusion in tech education and pioneered the development of the Black tech ecosystem in Canada. Huggins founded DRIVEN Accelerator Group, the first tech accelerator for underrepresented founders in Canada. She also founded Tech Spark, Canada's first technology school for Black youth, girls and other youth of colour.

Career 
Huggins pursued entrepreneurship in 2009 after losing her advertising job during the recession. In 2012, she created the first tech accelerator for BIPOC leaders in Canada, called DRIVEN. The accelerator raised $1.1 million for Black, Brown and women-led tech startups in Canada. In 2015, Huggins launched Canada's first technology school focused on BIPOC students, called Tech Spark. The school educated 1500 students in the first two years. In 2017, Huggins released her first book, Bossed Up: 100 Truths to Becoming Your Own Boss, God's Way! In November 2019, Huggins founded EDUlytics, later rebranded as Spark Plug, a digital tool that uses data, hip hop culture and artificial intelligence to personalize education and inform education policy.

In 2021, Huggins' technology company was awarded $1 million from TD Canada Trust, to scale Spark Plug to 40,000 North American students. This investment made Huggins the first woman in North America to lead the development of an EdTech platform with the use of AI, Hip Hop culture and data science.

Education 
Huggins graduated in 2007 from Centennial College, and studied creative advertising with a major in media planning.

Filmography

Personal life 
Huggins is of Jamaican and Kittian descent and Nigerian ancestry. She was born in Etobicoke and grew up in Brampton, Ontario. She is the youngest of eight children.

Honours and awards 
 Harry Jerome Awards, Young Entrepreneur, 2015 
 Canadian Living Magazine, Canadian Superhero, 2015
 CIBWE, 100 Black Women to Watch, 2015
 Canada's Top 150 Black Women Creating Impact Across the Country, CBC and Herstory in Black, 2017
 Move The Dial, Dial Mover, 2019
 The City of Brampton, Innovation Award, 2020
 TD Canada Trust, TD Ready Challenge Winner, 2021
 Centennial College, Alumnus of Distinction, 2021
 Womxn in Data Science Toronto, Trailblazer Award, 2022

References 

1986 births
Living people
Businesspeople from Toronto
People from Etobicoke
Women founders
Canadian women in business
Black Canadian businesspeople
Black Canadian women